Fayetteville Independent School District is a public school district based in Fayetteville, Texas (USA). It is located in east central Fayette County and classified as a 1A school by the UIL. The district has three campuses - Fayetteville High (Grades 9-12), Fayetteville Junior High (Grades 6-8), and Fayetteville Elementary (Grades PK-5).

In 2009, the school district was rated "exemplary" by the Texas Education Agency.

References

External links
Fayetteville ISD

School districts in Fayette County, Texas